Efstathios Topalidis (born 12 October 1978) is a Greek former amateur freestyle wrestler, who competed in the men's super heavyweight category. He wrestled for the Greek squad at the 2000 Summer Olympics in Sydney, and eventually captured a bronze medal in the 120-kg category at the 2005 European Championships in Varna, Bulgaria. Topalidis trained throughout his sporting career as a member of the wrestling team for Atlas Kallitheas Club in Athens, under the tutelage of his longtime coach Hristos Alexandridis.

Topalidis qualified for the Greek wrestling squad in the men's super heavyweight class (130 kg) at the 2000 Summer Olympics in Sydney. Nearly six months earlier, he beat Poland's Tomasz Szewczyk in a consolation match to round off the podium for the bronze and a ticket to the Games at the third pre-Olympic tournament in Mexico City, Mexico. Topalidis lost two straight matches each to Iran's eventual fourth-place finalist Abbas Jadidi (1–9) and Georgia's Alex Modebadze (0–5), wrapping up his maiden Games to last place in the prelim pool and fifteenth overall in the final standings.

References

External links
 

1978 births
Living people
Olympic wrestlers of Greece
Wrestlers at the 2000 Summer Olympics
Greek male sport wrestlers
Sportspeople from Athens
European Wrestling Championships medalists
21st-century Greek people